Melori Bigvava (born 17 January 1963 in Darcheli) is a Georgian professional football coach and a former player.

Career
Bigvava played professional football in the Soviet Top League with FC Dinamo Tbilisi. At age 30, he moved to Germany to join Wormatia Worms, and then finished his career in the German regional and amateur football leagues.

Bigvava appeared for the Georgia national football team in a 1990 friendly against Lithuania. He made his final appearance for Georgia in a 1993 friendly against Azerbaijan.

References

1963 births
Living people
Soviet footballers
Footballers from Georgia (country)
Expatriate footballers from Georgia (country)
Expatriate footballers in Germany
Football managers from Georgia (country)
Georgia (country) international footballers
FC Dinamo Tbilisi players
Wormatia Worms players
1. FC Saarbrücken players
FC Zugdidi players
FC Dinamo Batumi players
Borussia Neunkirchen players
Association football midfielders
Association football forwards